Matanzas High School (MHS) is located at 3535 Old Kings Road North in Palm Coast, Florida. The school's sports teams are known as the Pirates. As of 2013–2014, it was A-rated. The school colors are royal blue, silver and black.

On February 21, 2023, a 17-year old student was arrested after attacking his teacher and beating her into an unconscious state, allegedly because his Nintendo Switch was taken from him during class.

References

Educational institutions in the United States with year of establishment missing
Palm Coast, Florida
Public high schools in Florida
Schools in Flagler County, Florida